Guanyinge Subdistrict is a subdistrict of the city of Beizhen, Liaoning province, China. , it has one village, Hewa under its administration.

See also 
 List of township-level divisions of Liaoning

References 

Township-level divisions of Liaoning